Aproceros is a genus of insects in the family Argidae. Species of this genus are native to eastern Asia with one species, the elm zigzag sawfly (Aproceros leucopoda), that has been introduced to Europe and North America.

Species
The following species are recognised in the genus Aproceros:
 Aproceros antennatus Togashi, 1998
 Aproceros distinctus Wei, 1998
 Aproceros hakusanus Togashi, 1962
 Aproceros leucopoda Takeuchi, 1939 - elm zigzag sawfly
 Aproceros maculatus Wei, 1998
 Aproceros mikagei Togashi, 2003
 Aproceros okutanii Togashi, 1968
 Aproceros pallidicornis (Mocsáry, 1909)

References

Argidae
Sawfly genera